The TAKM, or Organization of the Eurasian Law Enforcement Agencies with Military Status (is an intergovernmental military law enforcement (gendarmerie) organization of three Turkic countries (Turkey, Azerbaijan, Kyrgyzstan) and, formerly, Mongolia. The initialism TAKM came from the founder countries' names.

The TAKM is considered as an alternative for the FIEP.

Member states 
In 2014, Mongolia quit the organization and Kazakhstan applied for membership.

References 

2013 establishments in Turkey
Intergovernmental organizations
Law enforcement in Europe
Law enforcement in Asia
Organizations based in Ankara
Organizations established in 2013
International Eurasian Organisation